Anumeta atrosignata is a moth of the family Erebidae first described by Francis Walker in 1858. It is found in the Arabian Desert, the Sinai, Israel, east to north-western India.

There are probably two generations per year. Adults are on wing from March to July.

The larvae feed on the Calligonum species.

External links

Image

Toxocampina
Moths of the Arabian Peninsula
Moths of the Middle East
Moths of Asia
Moths described in 1858